The 8th Lo Nuestro Awards ceremony, presented by Univision honoring the best Latin music of 1995 and 1996 took place on May 9, 1996, at a live presentation held at the James L. Knight Center in Miami, Florida. The ceremony was broadcast in the United States and Latin America by Univision.

During the ceremony, nineteen categories were presented. Winners were announced at the live event and included Mexican singer-songwriter Marco Antonio Solís receiving four competitive awards and the special recognition "Excellence Award". Other multiple winners were Cuban-American performer Gloria Estefan with four awards, Spanish singer Enrique Iglesias with three, and Tejano singer Pete Astudillo with two. Iglesias won the award for "Pop Album of the Year," Mexican singer-songwriter Juan Gabriel earned the award for "Regional Mexican Album of the Year," and Estefan won for "Tropical/Salsa Album of the Year." A special tribute was given to Tejano singer Selena and Cuban performer Israel "Cachao" López.

Background 
In 1989, the Lo Nuestro Awards were established by Univision, to recognize the most talented performers of Latin music. The nominees and winners were selected by a voting poll conducted among program directors of Spanish-language radio stations in the United States and the results were tabulated and certified by the accounting firm Arthur Andersen. The categories included are for the Pop, Tropical/Salsa, Regional Mexican and Music Video. The trophy awarded is shaped like a treble clef. The 8th Lo Nuestro Awards ceremony was held on May 7, 1996, in a live presentation held at the James L. Knight Center in Miami, Florida. The ceremony was broadcast in the United States and Latin America by Univision.

Winners and nominees 

Winners were announced before the live audience during the ceremony. Mexican singer-songwriter Marco Antonio Solís was the most nominated performer, with five nominations which resulted in four wins shared with his band Los Bukis, which included both Pop and Regional Group of the Year. Spanish singer Enrique Iglesias was awarded "Pop Album of the Year", "New Pop Artist of the Year", and "Pop Song of the Year" with "Si Tú Te Vas". Iglesias debut album also earned the Grammy Award for Best Latin Pop Album. Cuban-American singer Gloria Estefan won all her four nominations. Two songs nominated for Pop Song of the Year reached number one at the Billboard Top Latin Songs chart: Iglesias "Si Tú Te Vas" and "Si Nos Dejan" by Mexican singer Luis Miguel; "Abriendo Puertas" by Estefan was named "Tropical/Salsa Song of the Year" and also reached number one in the chart. Puerto-Rican American performer Ricky Martin earned the accolade for Best Music Video for "Te Extraño, Te Olvido, Te Amo".

Dominican band Ilegales and American singer Marc Anthony earned one award each at the Tropical/Salsa field; Ilegales won for "New Artist", while Anthony received "Male Singer of the Year". In the Regional Mexican field, Tejano performer Pete Astudillo dominated the field after winning "New Artist" and "Song of the Year" for his Tribute to late singer Selena titled "Como Te Extraño"; Mexican pop singer Cristian Castro received the award for "Male Singer of the Year", fellow Mexican singer-songwriter Juan Gabriel with "El México Que Se Nos Fue" was named "Album of the Year".

Honorary awards
Excellence Award: Marco Antonio Solís.
Special Tribute: Selena and Israel "Cachao" López.

See also
1995 in Latin music
1996 in Latin music
Grammy Award for Best Latin Pop Album
Grammy Award for Best Mexican/Mexican-American Album
Grammy Award for Best Traditional Tropical Latin Album

References

1996 music awards
Lo Nuestro Awards by year
1996 in Florida
1996 in Latin music
1990s in Miami